A gubernatorial election was held on 30 April 1951 to elect the Governor of Saga Prefecture. Incumbent Gen'ichi Okimori lost the election to Naotsugu Nabeshima, who subsequently became his successor.

Candidates
 – Member of the House of Peers, age 38
 – incumbent Governor of Saga Prefecture, age 51

Results

References

Saga gubernatorial elections
1951 elections in Japan